Giuseppe Zauli (1763 – 1822) was an Italian painter and engraver.

He trained at the Accademia Clementina of Bologna. He was a collaborator with Francesco Rosaspina and Felice Giani. He dedicated himself to the practice and teaching of engraving. He was the first director of a school of fine arts in Faenza, called "Scuola di Disegno e Plastica", begun in 1796. This would become the Scuola di Disegno Tommaso Minardi.

References

1763 births
1822 deaths
18th-century Italian painters
Italian male painters
19th-century Italian painters
Painters from Bologna
People from Faenza
19th-century Italian male artists
18th-century Italian male artists